Nicola Ruffoni (born 14 December 1990) is an Italian racing cyclist.

Career
He competed in the 2014 Giro d'Italia, but failed to finish within the time limit on stage 11. He rode in the 2015 Giro d'Italia, but withdrew on stage 15.

In May 2017, one day before the start of the 2017 Giro d'Italia, the UCI announced that Ruffoni and  team-mate Stefano Pirazzi had tested positive for growth hormone-releasing peptides in out-of-competition controls carried out the previous month. Later that month the UCI confirmed that both riders' B-samples had also tested positive, leading Bardiani-CSF to confirm that they would terminate both riders' contracts. On 14 December 2017, the Union Cycliste Internationale (UCI) banned Ruffoni for four years, and as a result, he was unable to compete until May 2021.

Major results

2009
 5th Trofeo Città di Brescia
2010
 6th Circuito del Porto
2012
 2nd Circuito del Porto
 2nd Trofeo Città di Brescia
 5th Road race, UEC European Under-23 Road Championships
 5th Trofeo Papà Cervi
2013
 1st  Road race, Mediterranean Games
 Giro del Friuli-Venezia Giulia
1st Stages 1 & 2
 4th Circuito del Porto
 8th Trofeo Alcide Degasperi
2014
 1st Stage 3 Tour du Poitou-Charentes
 8th Gran Premio Bruno Beghelli
2015
 7th Grand Prix de Denain
2016
 1st Gran Premio Bruno Beghelli
 Tour of Austria
1st Stages 1 & 6
 2nd Coppa Bernocchi
2017
 Tour of Croatia
1st  Points classification
1st Stages 3 & 4

Grand Tour general classification results timeline

References

External links

1990 births
Living people
Italian male cyclists
Cyclists from Brescia
Doping cases in cycling
Italian sportspeople in doping cases
Mediterranean Games medalists in cycling
Mediterranean Games gold medalists for Italy
Competitors at the 2013 Mediterranean Games